Akal Purakh is an interchangeable Sikh name used to denote God, or the omnipresent divine.

Meaning 
Literally it means "a timeless being who never dies." The first word Akal, literally "timeless, immortal, non-temporal," is a term integral to Sikh tradition and philosophy. It is extensively used in the Sri Guru Granth Sahib and Dasam Granth hymns by Guru Gobind Singh, who titled one of his poetic compositions Akal Ustat, i.e. "In Praise (ustati) of the Timeless One (akal)". However, the concept of Akal is not peculiar to the Dasam Granth. It goes back to the very origins of the Sikh faith.

The term Kāl refers to "time," with the negative prefix a- added to render the word akal, meaning "timeless" or "eternal." Purakh refers to "being" or "entity." Together, the two words form the meaning "timeless, eternal being."

The word Purakh is the Punjabi variation of Purusha.

See also 
 Akal
 Ik Onkar
 Names of God
 Nirankar
 Waheguru 
 Purusha

References 

Names of God in Sikhism
Sikh terminology